John Prescott Hedley (1876–1957) FRCS, FRCP, FRCOG was a British surgeon and foundation fellow of the Royal College of Obstetricians and Gynaecologists.

References

1876 births
1957 deaths
Fellows of the Royal College of Obstetricians and Gynaecologists
20th-century British medical doctors
British obstetricians
British gynaecologists
Fellows of the Royal College of Surgeons
Fellows of the Royal College of Physicians